TK is a Peruvian pop rock band formed in 2001 by Emilio Pérez de Armas and Edgar Guerra.

Pérez and Guerra met at university. During their free time they played guitar together, and they decided to form a rock band. Later Christopher Farfán, Diego Dibós and Carlos Lescano joined them to form TK. The name TK was taken from the first letters of Thalita Kumi, a phrase taken from the New Testament, which the band says means "Levántate y anda" (Spanish: "Arise and walk"). (In English translations of the New Testament, the phrase is usually rendered as Talitha cumi, Aramaic for "Maiden, arise.")

In 2002 they sent copies of their first album, Trece (Spanish: "Thirteen"), to stores. In that year Sony Music awarded TK with Gold and Silver discs for sales of their album in Perú.

In 2003 TK and Zen, both Peruvian rock bands, were nominated by MTV for the award of Best New Central American Artist. TK won.

In 2004, their most recent album, Tentando Imaginarios, was released, with the hit single "Buscama." This was the #1 most requested rock video among MTV viewers. Other hit songs from the album are "Ilusión," "Alas Cortadas" and "Inminente Conjunción."

In 2005, TK made the soundtrack for the animated movie Piratas en el Callao. The song "La Juerga Pirata" was the main hit of the soundtrack.

In 2006, June, they announced their separation, but in November, guitarist, Emilio Pérez de Armas reformed the band with new members. He took the place of lead singer.

In 2007 they released their 3rd album, "Nucleo" with the lead single "Fragmentos".

Members
Emilio Pérez de Armas (Vocals, Guitars) 2001–Present
Juan Francisco Escobar (drums) 2007–Present
Miguel Ginocchio (keyboards) 2007–Present

Past members
Diego Dibos (Vocals, Guitar) 2001 - 2006
Carlos Lescano (Bass) 2001 - 2006
Edgar Guerra (Guitar) 2001 - 2006
Christopher Farfan (Drums) 2001 - 2006

Albums
Trece (2002)
Tentando Imaginarios (2004)
Soundtrack: Piratas en el Callao (2005)
Nucleo (2007)

Singles
From "Trece":
"Inminente conjunción" (2002)
"Alas cortadas" (2002)
"A Lina" (2002)
"Aquellos que nunca quisieron" (2003)
"Buscando la victoria" (2003)

From "Tentando Imaginarios":
"Abril" (2004)
"Ilusión" (2004)
"Buscama" (2005)

From "Nucleo":
"Fragmentos" (2007)

Other:
"La Juerga Pirata" (from "Los Piratas del Callao" Soundtrack) (2005)

References

Peruvian rock music groups
Musical groups established in 2001